VC CSKA Sofia, is a professional volleyball team based in Sofia, Bulgaria. It plays in the Bulgaria volley league.

On 5 May 1948 establishing a sports club "September at CDV" which incorporates seven club sports, including volleyball. His successor is consistent volleyball teams CDNV, CDNA, CSKA "Cherveno zname", CSKA "Septemvriysko zname" CSKA and again that in the period 1948 – 2022 г. won 29 titles in men and 22 for women and 19 cups Bulgaria in men and 19 in women. Abbreviation Club "CSKA" means "Central Sports Club of the Army".

In the year of his championship winning team and laid the foundations of volleyball VC CSKA, Kostadin Shopov (player-coach of the team), Dragomir Stoyanov, Dimitar Dimitrov, Dimitar Elenkov, Konstantin Totev, Ivan Ivanov, Dimitar Dimitrov, Peter Shishkov, Alexander Velev Milko Karaivanov (then coach of the male and female trimmings).

For several decades CSKA established itself as a brand name for professional success in the field of volleyball, known both nationally and globally.

Proof of that are earned in 1969 and 1976 European Cup and Cup of buying men's team of CSKA. The first European title in CSKA (1969) was actually the first ever medal won by the Bulgarian men's team in team sports. In the history of Bulgarian volleyball it contributes to serious popularize this sport in Bulgaria, and in addition gives a solid dose of confidence to its development in the country. Fact receiving confirmation the following year when Sofia's World Volleyball Championship, which the Bulgarian national team took second place, and the best player of the tournament was elected Dimitar Zlatanov. With this success starts factual affirmation of our national team in the world, and enjoying time with an extremely good reputation in the international field.

European awards for women in the period 1979 – 1984 years. (1979 Cup, 1984 Cup Winners' Cup in 1982) raised the prestige of the women's division in the club and start a serious domination of the domestic championship, CSKA in the 1980s. Among other successes CSKA during 1978 – 1980, were the prelude and the European Cup of Bulgaria from the European Championships in Sofia during 1981.

From this point you can safely say that the players of CSKA always been the giants of the national teams of Bulgaria. Over the years the club has contributed to the realization of several generations of talented volleyball players that have become legends of the Bulgarian volleyball. These include E. Zlatanov (won eight titles), Ivan Ivanov, D. Karov, Ivan Seferinov, Ivan Nikolov (won eight league titles as a player and five championships as head coach of CSKA Sofia), Borislav Kiossev (won most titles – 9), Lyubo Ganev, N. Ivanov, V. Todorov, Aleksandar Popov, K. Todorov and many others. Women should not be missed unforgettable moments with the red team M. Mineva, M. Stoeva, R. Kaisheva, E. Shahanova, T. Bozhurina, V. Stoyanova, V. Nikolova, P. Natova, E. Pashova, M. Kyoseva, C. Haralampieva, Desislava Nikodimova and Elitsa Nikodimova, A. Zetova, N. Marinova, V. Borisova and others.

Are undeniable merits to the development and validation of VC CSKA by coaching staffs. Generations coaches in their work with adolescent athletes and gave reason to talk about School of CSKA and mostly Bulgarian volleyball school. Family Shahanova, Dimitar Dimitrov, Milko Karaivanov, Vasil Simov, Ivan Nikolov, Dimitar Karov, Maria Mineva, Verka Nikolova, Stefan Hristov, Alexandar Popov, Atanas Petrov, Katia Marashlieva and many others. Shahanova created a generation Stoeva, Stoyanova, Kaisheva. Vasil Simov it further developed, laying the groundwork for the development of a new constellation of players like Pashova, Haralampieva, Desislava Nikodimova, Mila Kyoseva, Boneva and others. For men, he found and build volleyball greats Ivan Nikolov, Borislav Kyosev, Stefan Sokolov, Stefan Petrov, Stoyan Gunchev, Petko Petkov and others. Tireless in his last breath Ivan Nikolov teacher consecutive school talent from CSKA – Elitsa Nikodimova, Antonina Zetova, Yulia Ivanova, Neli Marinova, Valya Ivanova, Larisa Simeonova, Petia Popova and others.

Honours

Men

NVL 29 times (record): 
  1948, 1949, 1957, 1958, 1962, 1968, 1969, 1970, 1971, 1972, 1973, 1976, 1977, 1978, 1981, 1982, 1983, 1984, 1986, 1987, 1988, 1989, 1990, 1993, 1994, 1995, 2008, 2010, 2011
Bulgarian Cup 19 times (record):
  1967, 1969, 1970, 1973, 1979, 1981, 1982, 1984, 1985, 1986, 1988, 1990, 1991, 1992, 1993, 2002, 2009, 2010, 2011
 CEV Champions League Winners: 
 1969CEV Champions League "Final Four" Participant:
 1963 (1/2 final), 1971 (1/2 final)
  1977 (3-rd), 1985 (3-rd)
 1987 (4-th), 1988 (4-th), 1990 (4-th)
 Cup Winner's Cup Winners:
  1976
 Cup Winner's Cup "Final Four" Participant:
  1986 (3-rd)
 1981 (4-th)
  CEV Cup "Final Four" Participant:
 2011 (1/2 final)

Women

NVL 22 times:
  1978, 1979, 1982, 1983, 1985, 1986, 1987, 1988, 1989, 1991, 1992, 1993, 1995, 2000, 2004, 2005, 2007, 2008, 2010, 2011, 2012, 2013
Bulgarian Cup 19 times:
  1969, 1976, 1979, 1981, 1982, 1983, 1985, 1986, 1988, 1989, 1993, 1995, 1996, 2000, 2004, 2008, 2010, 2011, 2013

International competitions 
  CEV Champions League:  Winners 2 times:
  1979, 1984
CEV Champions League "Final Four" Participant:
 1988 (4-th), 1989 (4-th)
 Cup Winner's Cup Winners 1 time:
  1982
 Cup Winner's Cup "Final Four" Participant:
 1973 (2-nd), 1976 (2-nd), 1991 (2-nd)
 1981 (3-rd)
 1977 (4-th)

VC CSKA in Europa – Total statistics

VC CSKA Sofia in European Volleyball

Women's VC CSKA Sofia in European Volleyball

Season by season

Team roster season 2022/2023 (Men's)

Players

Coaching staff

Team roster season 2022/2023 (Women's)

Players

Coaching staff

External links
Official website

Bulgarian volleyball clubs
CSKA Sofia